Giovanni Palmieri dos Santos (born 23 June 1989), sometimes known as just Giovanni, is a Brazilian professional footballer who plays for Santo André, mainly as a left back.

His younger brother, Emerson, is also a footballer.

Honours 
Fluminense
 Primeira Liga: 2016

América Mineiro
 Campeonato Brasileiro Série B: 2017

References

External links 
 
 

1989 births
Living people
Brazilian people of Italian descent
Brazilian footballers
Association football defenders
Campeonato Brasileiro Série A players
Campeonato Brasileiro Série B players
Esporte Clube Noroeste players
Botafogo Futebol Clube (SP) players
Guaratinguetá Futebol players
Clube Atlético Penapolense players
Criciúma Esporte Clube players
Fluminense FC players
Clube Náutico Capibaribe players
América Futebol Clube (MG) players
Associação Atlética Ponte Preta players
Esporte Clube Bahia players
Sportspeople from Santos, São Paulo